Williston Lake is a reservoir created by the W. A. C. Bennett Dam and is located in the Northern Interior of British Columbia, Canada.

Geography
The lake fills the basin of the upper Peace River, backing into the Rocky Mountain Trench which is where the Parsnip and Finlay met at Finlay Forks to form the Peace.

The reservoir is fed by the Finlay, Omineca, Ingenika, Ospika, Parsnip, Manson, Nation and Nabesche Rivers and by Clearwater Creek, Carbon Creek, and other smaller creeks.

Several provincial parks are maintained on the shore of the lake, including Muscovite Lakes Provincial Park, Butler Ridge Provincial Park, Heather-Dina Lakes Provincial Park and Ed Bird-Estella Provincial Park.

Tributaries

The following rivers empty into the Williston Reservoir:
Finlay River
Omineca River
Ingenika River
Ospika River
Parsnip River
Manson River
Nation River
Clearwater Creek
Nabesche River
Carbon Creek

History
Williston Lake was created in 1968 by the building of the W. A. C. Bennett Dam on the Peace River, which flooded the aboriginal-territorial home of the Tsay Keh Dene First Nation.

The reservoir was named after the Honourable Ray Gillis Williston, at the time the Minister of Lands, Forests and Water Resources.

References

External links

 BC Hydro. Williston Reservoir
 BC Hydro. Peace-Williston Fish and Wildlife Compensation Program
 

Lakes of British Columbia
Reservoirs in British Columbia
Peace River Country
Cassiar Land District